Tony Piñeda (born 5 January 1964) is a Mexican gymnast. He competed at the 1984 Summer Olympics and the 1988 Summer Olympics.

References

External links
 

1964 births
Living people
Mexican male artistic gymnasts
Olympic gymnasts of Mexico
Gymnasts at the 1984 Summer Olympics
Gymnasts at the 1988 Summer Olympics
Place of birth missing (living people)
Pan American Games medalists in gymnastics
Pan American Games bronze medalists for Mexico
Gymnasts at the 1987 Pan American Games
Medalists at the 1987 Pan American Games
UCLA Bruins men's gymnasts
20th-century Mexican people